Kasam ( is a 1992 Nepalese film, which stars Rajesh Hamal in a lead role along Kristi Mainali in a double role with  Beena Budhathoki, Shree Krishna Shrestha, Ganesh Upreti and Jagan Shreshtha. It also features Saroj Khanal and Mausami Malla in a guest appearance role in the song "Ban Maa Phoolyo Phool".  Rajesh Hamal and Kristi Mainali were seen together in this film after Yug Dekhi Yug Samma. film was " Super Hit " at the box office

References 

Nepalese drama films